The 2020 Big 12 Conference football season is the 25th season of the Big 12 Conference football taking place during the 2020 NCAA Division I FBS football season. The season began on September 3 with non-conference play. Conference play began on September 19, 2020. The entire schedule was released on October 21, 2019.

The 2020 season will be the ninth season for the Big 12 since the early 2010s conference realignment brought the Big 12 membership to its current form.

As a ten-team league, the Big 12 was scheduled to play a nine-game round-robin conference schedule and each member playing three non-conference games, one of which must be against a Power Five conference foe, however, due to the COVID-19 pandemic, all power five conference games were canceled, and each team will only play one non-conference game. The regular season will be followed by a conference championship game between the regular-season champion and the regular season runner-up.   
     
The 2020 Big 12 Championship Game was played at AT&T Stadium in Arlington, Texas, on December 19, 2020, and ended with Oklahoma claiming their sixth Big 12 title in a row by defeating the Iowa State Cyclones, 27–21.

Background

Previous season
In the 2019 season, Oklahoma defeated Baylor 27–20 in overtime in the conference championship.

Six teams were invited to bowl games in the 2019 season, and the conference went 1–5 in those games. Oklahoma earned the #4 seed in the College Football Playoff, but fell to LSU 28–63 in the Peach Bowl.

Preseason

Big 12 media days
The 2020 Big 12 media days will be held on July 21–22 in Frisco, Texas.

Preseason poll
The preseason poll will be released in mid-July 2020.

Preseason awards
2019 Preseason All-Big 12

Offensive Player of the Year: Chuba Hubbard, Oklahoma State
Defensive Player of the Year: Darius Stills, West Virginia
Newcomer of the Year: Spencer Rattler, Oklahoma

Head coaches
There was only one head coaching change in the conference following the conclusion of the 2019 season. On January 7, 2020, Baylor Bears coach Matt Rhule was hired as the new coach of the Carolina Panthers of the National Football League (NFL) after three years at the school. He was replaced by Dave Aranda on January 20, 2020.

Schedule
The regular season will begin on September 12, 2020 and will end on December 5, 2020. The season will conclude with the 2020 Big 12 Championship Game on December 19, 2020. The schedule is subject to changes due to the COVID-19 pandemic. Changes may include cancellation of individual games, cancellation of non-conference games, games played without fans in attendance, or the cancellation of the entire season. Multiple conferences have already canceled portions of or the entire season. As of August 8, 2020, fourteen non-conference games involving a Big 12 team have been canceled due to the pandemic. The Big 12 announced on August 3 that all teams will play 10 games, 9 conference games and 1 non-conference game. on August 12, the revised schedule was released

Regular season

Week One

Week Two

Week Three

Week Four

Week Five

Week Six

Week Seven

Week Eight

Week Nine

Week Ten

Week Eleven

Week Twelve

Week Thirteen

Week Fourteen

Championship Game

Rankings

Postseason

Bowl games
The Big 12 Conference earned two spots in the New Years Six with both participants in the Big 12 Championship earning a spot. The Big 12 has accomplished this for the third straight year.

Rankings are from CFP rankings.  All times Central Time Zone.  Big 12 teams shown in bold.

Records against other conferences

Regular Season

Post Season

Big 12 vs other conferences

Big 12 vs Power 5 matchups
This is a list of the Power Five conferences teams (ACC, Big Ten, Pac-12, Notre Dame, BYU and SEC). Due to the COVID-19 pandemic, The Big 12 had eleven scheduled games against Power Five conferences, however, each one was canceled. All of the other Power Five conferences initially announced that they would go on with their season as scheduled, but with cuts to non-conference games, The Big Ten, Pac-12, and SEC were all limiting play to in-conference games only. The ACC and Big 12 are allowing one non-conference game. The Big Ten and Pac 12 have postponed fall sports due to COVID-19 concerns.

Big 12 vs Group of Five matchups
The following games include Big 12 teams competing against teams from The American, C-USA, MAC, Mountain West or Sun Belt. On August 8, the MAC announced the postponement of all fall sports for the 2020 season, including football. On August 10, the Mountain West followed the MAC as the second Group of Five conference to postpone fall sports indefinitely. On August 10, Rice announced it was the delaying the start of it season until September 26.

Big 12 vs FBS independents matchups
The following games include Big 12 teams competing against FBS Independents which include Army, Liberty, New Mexico State, UConn and UMass.  UConn, announced that they would opt out of the 2020 season. UMass announced that they would opt of playing fall football and hopes to construct a season in spring 2021. New Mexico State announced that they would opt out of playing fall football and try to play in spring 2021.

Big 12 vs FCS matchups
The Football Championship Subdivision comprises 13 conferences and two independent programs. All conferences and teams have postponed their fall conference schedules, The Big South, (James Madison, Elon, Villanova from the CAA), Missouri Valley Football Conference, Ohio Valley Conference, SoCon, and Southland Conference are allowing the option of playing out-of-conference games only

Awards and honors

Player of the week honors

Offensive Player of the Week
S13 Sam Ehlinger, UT, QB, Sr.
S20 Tylan Wallace, OSU, WR, Sr.
S27 Skylar Thompson, K-State, QB, Sr.
Sam Ehlinger, UT, QB, Sr.
O5 Breece Hall, ISU, RB, So.
O12 T.J. Pledger, OU, RB, Jr.
O19 Leddie Brown, WVU, RB, Jr.
O26 Breece Hall, ISU, RB, So.
Marvin Mims, OU, WR, Fr.
N2 Rhamondre Stevenson, OU, RB, Sr.
Tylan Wallace, OSU, WR, Sr.
N9 Breece Hall, RB, ISU, So.
N16 T.J. Simmons, WVU, WR, Sr.
N23 Spencer Rattler, OU, QB, R-Fr.
N30 Charlie Brewer, BU, QB, Sr.
D7 Brock Purdy, ISU, QB, Jr.
D14 Dillon Stoner, OSU, WR, Sr.

Defensive Player of the Week
S13 Krishon Merriweather, TTU, LB, Jr.
S20 Malcolm Rodriguez, OSU, LB, Sr.
S27 JaQuan Bailey, ISU, DE, R-Sr.
Jahron McPherson, K-State, DB, Sr.
O5 La’Kendrick Van Zandt, TCU, S, Jr.
Darius Stills, WVU, DL, Sr.
O12 AJ Parker, K-State, DB, Sr.
O19 Josh Chandler-Semedo, WVU, LB, Jr.
O26 Terrel Bernard, BU, LB, Jr.
N2 Joseph Ossai, UT, LB, Jr.
N9 Mike Rose, ISU, LB, Jr.
N16 Tykee Smith, WVU, SPEAR, So.
N23 Ronnie Perkins, OU, DE, Jr.
N30 Latrell Bankston, ISU, DL, Jr.
D7 Amen Ogbongbemiga, OSU, LB, R-Sr.
D14 C.J. Caesar II, TCU, CB, So.

Home game attendance

Bold – exceeded capacity
† Season high
‡ Record stadium Attendance

NFL draft

The following list includes all Big 12 players who were drafted in the 2021 NFL Draft.

References